is a 1997 Japanese run and gun video game developed by NCS for the Sega Saturn. It is a direct sequel to Assault Suit Leynos, for the Mega Drive and is the third title in the Assault Suits series. It is a side-scrolling mecha shooting game set in the future.

Plot

Development 
Assault Suit Leynos was a game for the Mega Drive, and was followed up by a sequel Assault Suit Valken for the Super Famicom.

The game was developed by NCS and Masaya Games.

Gameplay 
Much like the original game, Leynos 2 is a 2D mecha action game.

The player's mech comes equipped with a jet-boost, a dash and a shield, which were upgrades that had to be earned in the original game. Customization can be done before each battle, equipping various items earned through the game. There are 50 weapons in total available in the game, as well as options to change the speed, maneuverability and the protective shields of the mech. There are special upgrade devices that alter various characteristics of the player's mech, such as aiming and a radar system.

A feature of the game is that the camera in the game will zoom in and out to show less or more detail on screen, which is useful given how large some enemies are. The zoom range is determined by the range of the currently equipped weapon.

Release 
Assault Suit Leynos 2 was released exclusively in Japan on February 21, 1997 for the Sega Saturn.

Reception 

Next Generation magazine gave the game 3 out of 5 stars. Reviewers for Famitsu gave it 25 out of 40 score.

Three reviewers from Gamefan gave the game scores of 80, 85, and 83 for an average of 82.6.

IGN gave it an 8 out of 10.

GameSpot gave it a 7.3 out of 10.

Consoles Plus gave the game 88.

Saturn Power gave it a score of 75.

The Japanese magazine Sega Saturn Magazine gave it a core of 7/10.

German magazine Maniac scored it well.

Notes

References 

1997 video games
Masaya Games games
Japan-exclusive video games
Sega Saturn games
Sega Saturn-only games
PlayStation Network games
Video games about mecha
Run and gun games
Video games developed in Japan
Single-player video games
Assault Suit